Lake Iijärvi (Ristijärvi) is a medium-sized lake in the Oulujoki main catchment area. It is located in the Kainuu region, northern Finland.

See also
List of lakes in Finland

References

Lakes of Ristijärvi
Lakes of Paltamo